Phrissoma terricolum is a species of beetle in the family Cerambycidae. It was described by James Thomson in 1864. It is known from South Africa.

References

Phrissomini
Beetles described in 1864